Cheilosia pagana is a Holarctic species of hoverfly. Like most Cheilosia it is black, and because of this may often be overlooked as a hoverfly. One identifying feature is a large red to orange 3rd antennal segment.

Description
For terms see Morphology of Diptera

Wing length 4.75-8·5 mm. Antennae with third segment clear orange and very large:no furrow. Frons flat in male. Thoracic pubescence variable. Female scutellum entirely black. Legs part yellow. Tarsi 1 with pale central segments pale. Part of the pagana species group.

Distribution
Present in most of Europe and in the eastern Palearctic realm. East to Siberia. Nearctic

Biology
Habitat: coniferous and deciduous woodland, unimproved grassland, along hedgerows in farmland and at roadsides. Scrub and carr. Flowers visited include yellow composites, Ranunculaceae, white umbellifers, Allium ursinum, Anemone nemorosa, Fragaria, Potentilla erecta, Primula, Prunus spinosa and Salix.
Flight period is from May to September. In southern Europe, on the wing from mid March. Larvae are known to inhabit semi-liquid, decaying tissue of the roots of plants. There is a rearing record from decaying roots of Cow Parsley.

References

Diptera of Europe
Diptera of North America
Hoverflies of North America
Eristalinae
Insects described in 1822
Taxa named by Johann Wilhelm Meigen